Khadab is a small village close to the town of Nador in Morocco.

Gallery

Populated places in Oriental (Morocco)
Rif